Sharad Devarajan is the co-founder and chief executive officer of Liquid Comics LLC, a digital entertainment company that uses the medium of graphic novel storytelling to develop original content for various digital platforms, publishing, theatrical live-action films, animation and games. Devarajan is also the co-founder and CEO of the Graphic India Pte. Ltd., which he co-founded with CA Media LP, the Asian investment arm of Peter Chernin's The Chernin Group, LLC. Graphic India, is focused on launching characters, heroes and stories that tap into the unique creativity and culture of India but appeal to audiences worldwide. In the same way the West has created superheroes or Japan launched anime.

Prior to Graphic India, Devarajan was the co-founder, chief executive officer and publisher of Virgin Comics LLC and Virgin Animation Pvt. Ltd, a set of companies he co-founded with Sir Richard Branson and the Virgin Group, acclaimed author Deepak Chopra, filmmaker Shekhar Kapur and entrepreneurs Gotham Chopra and Suresh Seetharaman. Mr. Devarajan led a management buyout of Virgin Comics and renamed the company, Liquid Comics.

Devarajan is also an adjunct associate professor at Columbia Business School where he teaches, Media Marketing and Entrepreneurship, Transmedia & Transcreation: How Technology and Globalization are Transforming Media, and Virtual Reality & the Future of Storytelling. He also co-teaches the class, Just Capitalism & Cause Driven Marketing, with author Deepak Chopra, and teaches

At Liquid Comics, Devarajan built a studio of artists and writers to create a new wave of mythic character properties in comics, games, animation and live-action films. Devarajan has also created entertainment products with acclaimed filmmakers, actors and musicians including John Woo, Guy Ritchie, Edward Burns, Nicolas Cage, Barry Sonnenfeld, and Wes Craven.

Mr. Devarajan is also a Producer / Executive Producer on a number of theatrical live-action film projects based on the companies’ comic properties including, the film adaptation of Gamekeeper with director Guy Ritchie, The Leaves with Summit Entertainment., Ramayan 3392 A.D with Mandalay Entertainment, Dominion: Dinosaurs Versus Aliens, with director Barry Sonnenfeld and producer Arnold Rifkin and a creator of Ani-Max and First Family, two television shows in development with FremantleMedia Enterprises.

In 2013, Devarajan worked with Stan Lee to create a new Indian superhero, Chakra the Invincible and was the director and executive producer of an animated film based on the character which launched on Cartoon Network. Chakra the Invincible was also selected as one of the first wave of third party content to be launched from Rovio Entertainment worldwide through the Angry Birds app's ToonsTV platform.

In digital entertainment, Devarajan worked with Batman comic book writer, Grant Morrison as executive producer and co-writer on Graphic India's digital web series, 18-Days, which is a modern reinvention of the epic Indian myth, Mahabharata. Devarajan also worked with filmmaker John Woo and Tiger Hill, as executive producer on the animated web series, “Seven Brothers,” which premiered on YouTube's, Machinima channel.

In 2011, Devarajan worked with the estate of Elvis Presley to launch a book, Graphic Elvis, which he served as editor and co-author of and which was released on the 35th anniversary of Elvis's death. As part of the creation of the book, Devarajan was granted access to many of Elvis's personal writings and notes in how many books at Graceland which were featured for the first time in the book.

In 2010, through Liquid Comics, Devarajan partnered with the Open Hands Initiative, to bring together a group of American and Middle Eastern students with disabilities to work together and create a new superhero that reflected their shared challenges and shared values. The superhero, “Silver Scorpion”, received worldwide acclaim for promoting advocacy for the rights of the disabled in the Middle East and was launched as a digital web series on MTV Voices. President Bill Clinton honored the students at the Clinton Global Initiative, stating that the comic book “will help to establish trust and understanding between cultures, to empower young people with disabilities.”

Previously, Devarajan was also the co-founder, president and CEO of Gotham Entertainment Group, South Asia's leading comic book publisher. Mr. Devarajan was instrumental in securing and launching the South Asian publishing program for DC Comics, Marvel Comics, Dark Horse Comics, Cartoon Network and Warner Bros. introducing the South Asian market to such notable comic magazines including Superman, Spider-Man, Batman, Hulk, and X-Men. In 2004, Devarajan worked with Marvel Comics to reinvent the Spider-Man character as an Indian boy growing up in Mumbai. Unlike traditional translations of western comic magazines, the new series, Spider-Man: India was heralded as the industry's first “transcreation” where instead of a literal translation for a foreign market, the character was "trans-created" into an Indian boy named Pavitr Prabhakar living in Mumbai.

References

External links
 NPR Radio Interview: a Spider-Man: India radio interview on NPR with one of the creators Sharad Devarajan

 New York Magazine: a New York Magazine article on Spider-Man India
 BBC article on the Indian Spider-Man
 WSJ article on Virgin

 Liquid Comics website
 Graphic India website
 18 Days Animated Series
 USA Today article on Graphic Elvis
 Nerdist Interview
 Sharad Devarajan TEDX Gateway
 Wall Street journal article on formation of Graphic India
 The Hollywood Reporter article on Chakra the Invincible
 CNN interview
 Bloomberg News interview
 Time Magazine article on Silver Scorpion
 The Hollywood Reporter article on Silver Scorpion
 Deadline article on Graphic India
 San Diego ComicCon Nerdist Interview on 18 Days
 Columbia Business School Profile

Comic book publishers (people)
Living people
1975 births